Cherrie's antwren (Myrmotherula cherriei) is a species of bird in the family Thamnophilidae. It is found in southern Colombia, Venezuela, northeastern Peru and northwestern Brazil.

Its natural habitats are subtropical or tropical moist lowland forests and subtropical or tropical dry shrubland.

This bird is called Cherrie's antwren to honor the memory of American naturalist, explorer and adventurer George Cherrie. Dr. Cherrie accompanied former President Theodore Roosevelt in the famous 1913 exploration of the River of Doubt, in the Brazilian Amazon basin, which was later named Rio Roosevelt.

References

Cherrie's antwren
Birds of Colombia
Birds of the Brazilian Amazon
Birds of the Peruvian Amazon
Birds of the Venezuelan Amazon
Cherrie's antwren
Taxonomy articles created by Polbot